Simone Brugaletta (born 19 January 1994) is an Italian footballer who plays as a defender for Acireale.

Career

Brugaletta started his career with Italian Serie A side Catania. In 2014, Brugaletta signed for Teramo in the Italian third tier, where he made 27 appearances and scored 0 goals. On 10 August 2014, he debuted for Teramo during a 2–3 loss to Südtirol.

In 2020, Brugalleta signed for Italian fourth tier club Sant'Agata.

References

External links

 

1994 births
Association football defenders
Catania S.S.D. players
Footballers from Sicily
Sicily international footballers
Italian footballers
Living people
People from Modica
Serie C players
Serie D players
S.S. Chieti Calcio players
S.S. Teramo Calcio players
S.S.D. Acireale Calcio 1946 players
S.S.D. Città di Gela players